Tan Paey Fern is a Singaporean table tennis Player.

Tan was talent-scouted by ex-National Table Tennis Coach, Mr. Foo Soo Peng, when she was playing table tennis casually with her brother and some friends at the age of 9. Tan was a very determined young girl. She gave up her studies to practice table tennis. Her parents were worried but were very supportive. Tan's skills vastly improved, and she soon turned semi-professional, becoming a full-time professional player in 1993.

Post athletic career
On 10 January 2018, Fern, was named as the chef de mission of Singapore's first ever Winter Olympic team.

Achievements
2007
Commonwealth Championships
Gold - Women's Team
Bronze - Mixed Doubles (partner: Cai Xiao Li)
2006
15th Asian Games
Silver - Women's Team
5th South East Asian Championships
Gold - Women's Team
Gold - Women's Doubles (partner: Zhang Xueling)
Silver - Women's Singles
Silver - Mixed DOubles
Commonwealth Games
Gold - Women's Team
Silver - Women's Doubles (partner: Xu Yan)
Bronze - Mixed Doubles (partner: Ho Jia Ren Jason)
2005
ITTF Korea Open
1st - Women's Doubles (partner: Zhang Xueling)
Asian Cup
5th - Women's Singles
2004
Commonwealth Championships
Gold - Women's Team
Gold - Women's Doubles
Bronze - Women's Singles
Oylimpic Games
Top 16 - Women's Doubles (partner: Zhang Xueling)
2003
22nd SEA Games
1997
Commonwealth Championships
Gold - Women's Team
Silver - Women's Singles
Silver - Women's Doubles

References

External links
 
 ITTF DATABASE

Living people
Singaporean sportspeople of Chinese descent
Olympic table tennis players of Singapore
Singaporean female table tennis players
Table tennis players at the 2004 Summer Olympics
Asian Games medalists in table tennis
Table tennis players at the 2002 Asian Games
Table tennis players at the 2006 Asian Games
Commonwealth Games medallists in table tennis
Commonwealth Games gold medallists for Singapore
Commonwealth Games silver medallists for Singapore
Commonwealth Games bronze medallists for Singapore
Medalists at the 2002 Asian Games
Medalists at the 2006 Asian Games
Asian Games silver medalists for Singapore
Asian Games bronze medalists for Singapore
Southeast Asian Games medalists in table tennis
Southeast Asian Games bronze medalists for Singapore
Table tennis players at the 2006 Commonwealth Games
Competitors at the 2003 Southeast Asian Games
1974 births
Medallists at the 2002 Commonwealth Games
Medallists at the 2006 Commonwealth Games